The Laganside Corporation was a non-departmental public body formed by the Laganside Development (Northern Ireland) Order 1989 with the goal of regenerating large sections of land in Belfast, Northern Ireland adjacent to the River Lagan. This development area was expanded in 1996 to include areas closer to the city centre.

The Lagan riverside suffered in particular from poor environmental conditions and the decline of the shipbuilding industry in the 1970s and 80s.

The corporation was wound up in March 2007 and its responsibilities transferred to the Department for Social Development.

History
The Department of the Environment-commissioned Laganside Concept Plan was completed in March 1987, an initiative of Chris Patten and Richard Needham, two Northern Ireland Office ministers.  To deliver this plan, Laganside Ltd. was established in October 1987 as an interim measure; the Laganside Development Order (Northem Ireland) 1989 established the Laganside Corporation in May 1989.

The Corporation's original mission statement was:

"to contribute to the revitalisation of Belfast and Northern Ireland through the regeneration of the Laganside area. It has one target: for every £1 of expenditure, investment levels of £5.20 must be achieved. Its current mission statement reflecting a change in emphasis is contributing to the revitalisation of Belfast and Northern Ireland by transforming Laganside to be attractive, accessible and sustainable, recognised as a place of opportunity for all".

Laganside Corporations aims closely followed the Urban Delivery Corporation model:

"The object of the Corporation shall be to secure the regeneration of the designated area. The object is to be achieved in particular by the following means:
By bringing land and buildings into effective use.
By encouraging public and private investment and the development of existing and new industry and commerce.
By creating an attractive environment. 
By ensuring that housing, social, recreational and cultural facilities are available to encourage people to live and work in the area."
The corporation was wound up in March 2007 and its responsibilities transferred to the Department for Social Development under the terms of the Laganside Corporation Dissolution Order (Northern Ireland) 2006.

Developments
Lagan Weir 

The weir, completed in 1994, is built across the Lagan between the Queen Elizabeth Bridge and the M3 bridge (completed around the same time). The Lagan Weir was jointly funded by the Corporation and the European Commission. The objective of the structure is to keep the level of the river artificially constant, as it is a tidal river the level of the water varied up to three metres between high and low tide. This exposed mudflats which were unsightly and emitted a strong odour, particularly in the summer months. The transformation of the riverside by the construction of the weir has been a catalyst for development along the riverside. Another part of the project is the "Lagan Lookout" centre which explains the history and function of the weir as well as the history of the Lagan itself.

Lanyon Place 

In many ways the flagship development of the Corporation. The Waterfront Hall is located on the site as well as Riverside Tower, (headquarters of BT Northern Ireland ) and the 5-star Hilton Hotel. The Lanyon Quay building was added recently. The development is named after architect Charles Lanyon.

The Odyssey

The Odyssey development was Northern Ireland main "Millennium Project." A budget of £92 million was established; 49% funded by the Millennium Commission, 11% by the Laganside Corporation, 18.5% by the Department of Culture, Arts and Leisure, 18.5% by the Sheridan Group and 3.3% by the Sports Council. When completed in 2001, facilities included:
Vue multiscreen cinema
IMAX Cinema (now closed)
10,000 seat indoor arena and home of the Belfast Giants ice-hockey team
W5 ("Who when why what where" exhibition)
Bars, clubs, restaurants and entertainment
Gasworks

A redevelopment of the city's former Gasworks by Belfast City Council and Laganside Corporation. The development has retained much of the buildings of the gasworks which was closed in 1988, including the "Klondyke Building" now home to the Northern Ireland Environment Agency which lines the Ormeau Road and its restored clock tower. The area between this and the Lagan has been cleared, and the site's massive gas holders (once the largest in the world) have been removed.  The landmark tenant is the £45 million Halifax call centre building. Other tenants at the site include:
Radisson SAS Hotel
BBC Technology
Department for Social Development – Tenants of James House and The Lighthouse Building
Driver and Vehicle Licensing Northern Ireland.
Clarendon Dock 

The first site to be completed, this has become a major business park as well as the home to the Corporation when it was in existence.

Mays Meadow

Adjacent to Lanyon Place, has two major financial institutions, an Abbey call centre and the local headquarters of PricewaterhouseCoopers.

Donegall Quay and The Quays

Donegall Quay is a road linking Oxford Street to Corporation Square. The quay itself is located north of the Lagan Weir, between it and the M3 bridge. In February 2005 Laganside announced the Obel Tower, Northern Ireland's tallest building.

Custom House Square 

Custom House Square improved the link between Laganside and the city centre.

Cathedral Quarter 

The area around St. Anne's Cathedral is an important cultural centre.

References

External links
Laganside Corporation
GeographyinAction
Department for Social Development

1989 establishments in Northern Ireland
2007 disestablishments in Northern Ireland
Government agencies established in 1989
Government agencies disestablished in 2007
Organisations based in Belfast
Defunct public bodies of the United Kingdom
Non-Departmental Public Bodies of the Northern Ireland Executive